The Bundesverband der Pharmazeutischen Industrie (BPI) founded after WWII with headquarters in Berlin is a German Non-profit association and trade group for Small and medium-sized enterprises in the pharmaceutical industry.  it represented 240 classic pharmaceutical companies, pharmaceutical service providers, biotech companies, herbal medicines and homeopathy/anthroposophy with altogether approximately 78,000 employees. BPI´s focus has been on political consulting and public relations on the EU-level in order to enhance development in the national and international health care systems.

History
The Bundesverband der Pharmazeutischen Industrie (BPI) was founded after WWII with headquarters in Berlin as an Eingetragener Verein. It is the German industry association or trade group for a broad spectrum of companies in the pharmaceutical industry. BPI works

Large pharmaceutical companies in Germany are represented by the Verband Forschender Arzneimittelhersteller ("Association of Research-Based Pharmaceutical Companies", vfa).

Another pharmaceutical industry association in Germany, the Bundesverband der Arzneimittelhersteller ("German Medicines Manufacturers' Association", BAH), has about 450 company members including 150 traditional pharmaceutical manufacturers and about 150 other members with a business interest in healthcare, such as publishers and polling organizations.

The philosophy of BPI begins with the health of man and works towards enhancing the health care system to become more future-oriented. The company works towards this goal by aiding and consulting in several aspects of pharmaceutical and medical device development and improving market chances.

Function
BPI´s focus has been on political consulting and public relations on the EU-level. BPI headquarters is located in Berlin. There is also an office in Brussels. 
The BDI offers competencies in:
Drug safety
Biotechnology
Disinfection
Homoeopathy / Anthroposophy
Innovation and research
Clinical research
Communication / Public relations
Business development
Phytopharmacology
Politics
Law
Self-medication / Over the counter
Drug approval, both national and EU-wide

Members
As of 2017, the BPI represented about 250 German Large to medium to small pharmaceutical companies and biotech companies with altogether about 78,000 employees. 

Among the BPI's members are:
3M ESPE
Aeterna Zentaris
Amicus Therapeutics
B. Braun Melsungen
Baker & McKenzie
Camurus
Celgene
Fraunhofer-Gesellschaft
Fresenius SE & Co. KGaA
Gilead Sciences
Guerbet
Horizon Pharma
LEO Pharma	
Miltenyi Biotec
Mitsubishi Tanabe Pharma
Northwest Biotherapeutics
Novartis Pharma
Orion Pharma
Shionogi
Stallergenes
Zambon

Controversies
In 2008, the BPI was found to run a portal claiming to represent self-help support groups, while it propagated pharma industry interests.

In 2010, the BPI and the vfa were listed as the most powerful lobby groups for the pharma sector in Germany.

See also
Association of the British Pharmaceutical Industry (UK)
Pharmaceutical Research and Manufacturers of America (US)

References

External links

Lobbying in Germany
Pharmaceutical industry in Germany
Medical and health organisations based in Berlin
Pharmaceutical industry trade groups
Organizations established in 1951
1951 establishments in Germany